Peter Berry (born October 30, 2001) is an American wheelchair basketball player and social media personality. After a spinal cord injury left him paralyzed from the waist down in a car accident at age nine, he began competing in wheelchair basketball for  TIRR Memorial Hermann. In 2019, he accepted an athletic scholarship to play for the University of Alabama's wheelchair basketball team, where he began in 2020. Berry is also known for his social media presence, with over 5,000 followers and 650 thousand likes on TikTok. In 2022, it was revealed that he is training for the 2024 Summer Paralympics.

Early life
Berry was raised in Houston, Texas with his younger brother and sister by parents Joshua and Robin Berry. When he was nine years old, he and his family were involved in a motor vehicle collision when a distracted driver collided head-on with their vehicle, resulting in the death of his parents, and he and younger brother Aaron becoming paralyzed from the waist down and confined to wheelchairs. After the story was published by several news outlets across the United States, singer Justin Bieber launched the "Show Your Hearts" campaign aimed at raising funds for Berry's family. After his accident, Berry and his two siblings were taken in by their aunt and uncle, and resided in the Bellaire area. He attended the Emery/Weiner School.

Career

Basketball
While recovering from his injury, Berry started competing in wheelchair basketball, where he quickly became one of the best young wheelchair athletes in the United States. He led his TIRR Memorial Hermann Hotwheels team to three national titles and one national softball title. This success led him to receive a scholarship to play division 1 wheelchair basketball at the University of Alabama. In January 2020, he won the inaugural Houston Sports Insperity Inspiration Award.

In 2022, Berry started training for the 2024 Summer Paralympics with his teammates from the University of Alabama.

Television
In 2021, he and his brother appeared on an episode of Tamron Hall, to discuss their respective successes in wheelchair basketball.

Social media
In 2022, he posted a video on TikTok of him playing wheelchair basketball against his able bodied friend when he is pushed out of his wheelchair. It went viral, receiving over 3.4 million views and received over 650 thousand likes, and received mixed reception by users on the platform, with some users accusing Berry's friend of ableism.

Personal life
Over the years, he has become close friends with J. J. Watt. He is Jewish.

Filmography

Awards

See also
List of most-liked TikTok videos

Footnotes

Referencing

External links

2001 births
Alabama Crimson Tide men's basketball players
American disabled sportspeople
American men's wheelchair basketball players
American TikTokers
Basketball players from Houston
Jewish American sportspeople
Jewish men's basketball players
Living people
People from Alabama
People from Bellaire, Texas
Wheelchair sports competitors
People with paraplegia